Häxmästaren in Swedish and Heksemesteren in Norwegian (The Warlock in English) is a series of books by Norwegian-Swedish author Margit Sandemo. This series is Sandemo's second, following the extremely popular The Legend of the Ice People.

The series starts off with the Norwegian girl Tiril and Icelandic warlock Móri in the 18th century. It is set in Bergen, Norway and Iceland for the first few books, then moving to Sweden in book three. Later the action returns to Norway and eventually expands more throughout the series.

This series has not been translated to English, but can be found in Finnish, Hungarian, Icelandic, Norwegian, Polish, and Swedish.

The main theme in Häxmästaren is love, mystery, drama, and the supernatural.

Titles

Titles in other languages

References 

Novels by Margit Sandemo